Kevin Geniets (born 9 January 1997) is a Luxembourgish cyclist, who currently rides for UCI WorldTeam .

Major results

2013
 1st  Road race, National Novice Road Championships
2014
 2nd Time trial, National Junior Road Championships
 2nd Overall Tour du Pays de Vaud
 6th Overall Oberösterreich Juniorenrundfahrt
1st Stage 2
2015
 1st  Time trial, National Junior Road Championships
 4th Overall Niedersachsen-Rundfahrt
 4th Overall Tour du Pays de Vaud
 6th Road race, UEC European Junior Road Championships
2016
 National Under-23 Road Championships
1st  Time trial
1st  Road race
 National Road Championships
5th Time trial
5th Road race
 8th Road race, UEC European Under-23 Road Championships
2017
 6th Chrono des Nations U23
 6th Ronde van Vlaanderen Beloften
2019
 1st  Time trial, National Under-23 Road Championships
 2nd Road race, National Road Championships
 6th Boucles de l'Aulne
 7th Time trial, UEC European Under-23 Road Championships
 8th Paris–Camembert
 8th Ronde van Vlaanderen Beloften
 10th Grand Prix de Plumelec-Morbihan
2020
 National Road Championships
1st  Road race
3rd Time trial
 4th Overall Étoile de Bessèges
2021
 National Road Championships
1st  Road race
1st  Time trial
 9th Omloop Het Nieuwsblad
 10th Tro-Bro Léon
2022
 5th Overall Tour de Luxembourg
 10th Overall Tour des Alpes-Maritimes et du Var
 10th Tour du Doubs
2023
 4th Overall Tour des Alpes-Maritimes et du Var

Grand Tour general classification results timeline

References

External links

1997 births
Living people
Luxembourgian male cyclists
Sportspeople from Esch-sur-Alzette
Olympic cyclists of Luxembourg
Cyclists at the 2020 Summer Olympics